The Northeast Jr. Eagles are a Canadian Junior ice hockey club from St. John's, Newfoundland and Labrador.  They are members of the St. John's Junior Hockey League, are a former Junior A team, and were the first ever Don Johnson Cup Maritime Junior B champions in 1982.

History
Prior to 1980, junior hockey in St. John's was for the most part a juvenile-level recreation league.  Every year, an all-star team was drafted from the city and named the St. John's Jr. Capitals, after their senior team the St. John's Capitals, to compete against teams from across the province for the Veitch Memorial Trophy at either the Junior A or B level.

In 1980, the St. John's Junior Hockey League was organized and a legitimate Junior B league was formed.  The winner of this league, not an all-star team, would represent the city in provincial and inter-provincial events.  One of the founding members of this league was the St. John's "Brothers Rice" Jr. Celtics.  In 1982, the Celtics would win their first league championship.  They would win the Veitch Memorial Trophy and move on to the first ever Don Johnson Cup—an inter-provincial Junior Championship featuring the best Junior B clubs from New Brunswick, Prince Edward Island, Nova Scotia, and Newfoundland and Labrador.  In the final game, the Jr. Celtics defeated PEI's Kensington Bombers, 4–3, to win the first ever championship.  Newfoundland's own Don Johnson had the honour of awarding the trophy bearing his name to his own son, Celtics' Michael Johnson, at the first event.

Nine games into the 1982–83 season, the Celtics had to pull out of the league.  They were mothballed in 1983–84, but returned after that year off.

In 1989, the league retracted by half and was promoted to Junior A to compete for the Manitoba Centennial Cup at a National level.  The Celtics were a part of this Junior A experiment for its two seasons, but the winners of the two seasons (St. John's Jr. 50's and Avalon Jr. Capitals) did not fare well in national playdowns, and the entire league returned to Junior B in 1991.

The Jr. Celtics won the St. John's League championship in 1982, 1994, 1995, 2000, 2001, 2008, and 2011.  They won the Provincial Veitch Memorial Trophy in 1982, 1995, 2001, 2003, 2008, and 2011.  1982 remains the Celtics' only Don Johnson Cup.

In May 2016 all levels of hockey playing in the Jack Bryne Arena were re-branded as the Northeast Eagles.

Season-by-season record

References

External links
 

Ice hockey teams in Newfoundland and Labrador
Sport in St. John's, Newfoundland and Labrador
Ice hockey clubs established in 1980
1980 establishments in Newfoundland and Labrador